In enzymology, a choloylglycine hydrolase is an enzyme that catalyzes the chemical reaction

3alpha,7alpha,12alpha-trihydroxy-5beta-cholan-24-oylglycine + H2O  3alpha,7alpha,12alpha-trihydroxy-5beta-cholanate + glycine

Thus, the two substrates of this enzyme are 3alpha,7alpha,12alpha-trihydroxy-5beta-cholan-24-oylglycine and H2O, whereas its two products are 3alpha,7alpha,12alpha-trihydroxy-5beta-cholanate and glycine.

This enzyme belongs to the family of hydrolases, those acting on carbon-nitrogen bonds other than peptide bonds, specifically in linear amides.  The systematic name of this enzyme class is 3alpha,7alpha,12alpha-trihydroxy-5beta-cholan-24-oylglycine amidohydrolase. Other names in common use include glycocholase, bile salt hydrolase, and choloyltaurine hydrolase.  This enzyme participates in bile acid biosynthesis.

Structural studies

Research
A 2018 study has linked the enzyme in gut bacteria to obesity and carbohydrate metabolism dominating over fat metabolism.

References

 
 

EC 3.5.1
Enzymes of known structure
Obesity